The hammerhead sharks are a group of sharks that form the family Sphyrnidae, so named for the unusual and distinctive structure of their heads, which are flattened and laterally extended into a "hammer" shape called a cephalofoil. Most hammerhead species are placed in the genus Sphyrna, while the winghead shark is placed in its own genus, Eusphyra. Many different, but not necessarily mutually exclusive, functions have been postulated for the cephalofoil, including sensory reception, manoeuvering, and prey manipulation. The cephalofoil gives the shark superior binocular vision and depth perception.

Hammerheads are found worldwide in warmer waters along coastlines and continental shelves. Unlike most sharks, some hammerhead species usually swim in schools during the day, becoming solitary hunters at night.

Description
They are usually light gray and have a greenish tint. Their bellies are white, which allows them to blend into the background when viewed from below and sneak up to their prey. Their heads have lateral projections that give them a hammer-like shape. While overall similar, this shape differs somewhat between species; examples are: a distinct T-shape in the great hammerhead, a rounded head with a central notch in the scalloped hammerhead, and an unnotched rounded head in the smooth hammerhead.

Hammerheads have disproportionately small mouths compared to other shark species. They are also known to form schools during the day, sometimes in groups over 100. In the evening, like other sharks, they become solitary hunters. National Geographic explains that hammerheads can be found in warm, tropical waters, but during the summer, they participate in a mass migration to search for cooler waters.

Taxonomy and evolution

Since sharks do not have mineralized bones and rarely fossilize, only their teeth are commonly found as fossils. Their closest relatives are the requiem sharks (Carcharinidae). Based on DNA studies and fossils, the ancestor of the hammerheads probably lived in the Early Miocene epoch about 20 million years ago.

Using mitochondrial DNA, a phylogenetic tree of the hammerhead sharks showed the winghead shark as its most basal member. As the winghead shark has proportionately the largest "hammer" of the hammerhead sharks, this suggests that the first ancestral hammerhead sharks also had large hammers.

Cephalofoil 
The hammer-like shape of the head may have evolved at least in part to enhance the animal's vision. The positioning of the eyes, mounted on the sides of the shark's distinctive hammer head, allows 360° of vision in the vertical plane, meaning the animals can see above and below them at all times. They also have an increased binocular vision and depth of visual field as a result of the cephalofoil. The shape of the head was previously thought to help the shark find food, aiding in close-quarters maneuverability, and allowing sharp turning movement without losing stability. The unusual structure of its vertebrae, though, has been found to be instrumental in making the turns correctly, more often than the shape of its head, though it would also shift and provide lift. From what is known about the winghead shark, the shape of the hammerhead apparently has to do with an evolved sensory function. Like all sharks, hammerheads have electroreceptory sensory pores called ampullae of Lorenzini. The pores on the shark's head lead to sensory tubes, which detect electric fields generated by other living creatures. By distributing the receptors over a wider area, like a larger radio antenna, hammerheads can sweep for prey more effectively.

Reproduction
Reproduction occurs only once a year for hammerhead sharks, and usually occurs with the male shark biting the female shark violently until she agrees to mate with him. The hammerhead sharks exhibit a viviparous mode of reproduction with females giving birth to live young. Like other sharks, fertilization is internal, with the male transferring sperm to the female through one of two intromittent organs called claspers. The developing embryos are at first sustained by a yolk sac. When the supply of yolk is exhausted, the depleted yolk sac transforms into a structure analogous to a mammalian placenta (called a "yolk sac placenta" or "pseudoplacenta"), through which the mother delivers sustenance until birth. Once the baby sharks are born, they are not taken care of by the parents in any way. Usually, a litter consists of 12 to 15 pups, except for the great hammerhead, which gives birth to litters of 20 to 40 pups. These baby sharks huddle together and swim toward warmer water until they are old enough and large enough to survive on their own.

In 2007, the bonnethead shark was found to be capable of asexual reproduction via automictic parthenogenesis, in which a female's ovum fuses with a polar body to form a zygote without the need for a male. This was the first shark known to do this.

Diet
Hammerhead sharks eat a large range of prey such as fish (including other sharks), squid, octopus, and crustaceans. Stingrays are a particular favorite. These sharks are often found swimming along the bottom of the ocean, stalking their prey. Their unique heads are used as a weapon when hunting down prey. The hammerhead shark uses its head to pin down stingrays and eats the ray when the ray is weak and in shock. The great hammerhead, tending to be larger and more aggressive than most hammerheads, occasionally engages in cannibalism, eating other hammerhead sharks, including its own young. In addition to the typical animal prey, bonnetheads have been found to feed on seagrass, which sometimes makes up as much as half their stomach contents. They may swallow it unintentionally, but they are able to partially digest it. At the time of discovery, this was the only known case of a potentially omnivorous species of shark (since then, whale sharks were also found to be omnivorous).

Species

Relationship with humans

According to the International Shark Attack File, humans have been subjects of 17 documented, unprovoked attacks by hammerhead sharks within the genus Sphyrna since AD 1580. No human fatalities have been recorded.

The great and the scalloped hammerheads are listed on the World Conservation Union's (IUCN) 2008 Red List as endangered, whereas the smalleye hammerhead is listed as vulnerable. The status given to these sharks is as a result of overfishing and demand for their fins, an expensive delicacy. Among others, scientists expressed their concern about the plight of the scalloped hammerhead at the American Association for the Advancement of Science annual meeting in Boston. The young swim mostly in shallow waters along shores all over the world to avoid predators.

Shark fins are prized as a delicacy in certain countries in Asia (such as China), and overfishing is putting many hammerhead sharks at risk of extinction. Fishermen who harvest the animals typically cut off the fins and toss the remainder of the fish, which is often still alive, back into the sea. This practice, known as finning, is lethal to the shark.

In native Hawaiian culture, sharks are considered to be gods of the sea, protectors of humans, and cleaners of excessive ocean life. Some of these sharks are believed to be family members who died and have been reincarnated into shark form, but others are considered man-eaters, also known as niuhi. These sharks include great white sharks, tiger sharks, and bull sharks. The hammerhead shark, also known as mano kihikihi, is not considered a man-eater or niuhi; it is considered to be one of the most respected sharks of the ocean, an aumakua. Many Hawaiian families believe that they have an aumakua watching over them and protecting them from the niuhi. The hammerhead shark is thought to be the birth animal of some children. Hawaiian children who are born with the hammerhead shark as an animal sign are believed to be warriors and are meant to sail the oceans. Hammerhead sharks rarely pass through the waters of Maui, but many Maui natives believe that their swimming by is a sign that the gods are watching over the families, and the oceans are clean and balanced.

In captivity 
The relatively small bonnethead is regular at public aquariums, as it has proven easier to keep in captivity than the larger hammerhead species, and it has been bred at a handful of facilities. The larger hammerhead species can reach more than twice that size and are considered difficult, even compared to most other similar-sized sharks (such as Carcharhinus species, lemon shark, and sand tiger shark) regularly kept by public aquariums. They are particularly vulnerable during transport between facilities, may rub on surfaces in tanks, and may collide with rocks, causing injuries to their heads, so they require very large, specially adapted tanks. As a consequence, relatively few public aquaria have kept them for long periods. The scalloped hammerhead is the most frequently maintained large species, and it has been kept long term at public aquaria in most continents, but primarily in North America, Europe, and Asia. In 2014, fewer than 15 public aquaria in the world kept scalloped hammerheads. Great hammerheads have been kept at a few facilities in North America, including Atlantis Paradise Island Resort (Bahamas), Adventure Aquarium (New Jersey), Georgia Aquarium (Atlanta), Mote Marine Laboratory (Florida), and the Shark Reef at Mandalay Bay (Las Vegas). Smooth hammerheads have also been kept in the past.

Protection
Humans are the number one threat to hammerhead sharks. Although they are not usually the primary target, hammerhead sharks are caught in fisheries all over the world. Tropical fisheries are the most common place for hammerheads to be caught because of their preference to reside in warm waters. The total number of hammerheads caught in fisheries is recorded in the Food and Agriculture Organization of the United Nations Global Capture Production dataset. The number steadily increased from 75 metric tons in 1990, to 6,313 metric tons by 2010.

Shark fin traders say that hammerheads have some of the best quality fin needles which makes them good to eat when prepared properly. Hong Kong is the world's largest fin trade market and accounts for about 1.5% of the total annual amount of fins traded. It is estimated that around 375,000 great hammerhead sharks alone are traded per year which is equivalent to 21,000 metric tons of biomass. However, it is important to note that most sharks that are caught are only used for their fins and then discarded. The actual meat of hammerheads is generally unwanted. Consumption of regular hammerhead meat has been recorded in countries such as Trinidad, Tobago, Eastern Venezuela, Kenya, and Japan.

In March 2013, three endangered, commercially valuable sharks, the hammerheads, the oceanic whitetip, and porbeagle, were added to Appendix II of CITES, bringing shark fishing and commerce of these species under licensing and regulation.

Cultural significance
Among Torres Strait Islanders, the hammerhead shark, known as the beizam, is a common family totem and often represented in cultural artefacts such as the elaborate headdresses worn for ceremonial dances, known as dhari (dari). They are associated with law and order. Renowned artist Ken Thaiday Snr is known for his representations of beizam in his sculptural dari and other works.

See also

 List of hammerhead sharks
 List of prehistoric cartilaginous fish

References

External links

 
 Animal Diversity Web Genus Sphyrna with species sub-pages
 "Electroreception in juvenile scalloped hammerhead and sandbar sharks" by Stephen M. Kajiura and Kim N. Holland, The Journal of Experimental Biology (2002). Attempts to explain the "hammer" shape.
 Great hammerhead shark, Sphyrna mokarran, MarineBio.org
 
Hammerhead Sharks, Australian Marine Conservation Society
Hammerhead Shark - Video on Check123 - Video Encyclopedia

 
Extant Paleocene first appearances
Species endangered by use as food
Taxa named by Theodore Gill
Vertebrate parthenogenesis